People's Hero is a 1987 Hong Kong thriller film written and directed by Derek Yee and starring Ti Lung. The film was nominated for three Hong Kong Film Awards, where Tony Leung Chiu-wai and Elaine Jin won the Best Supporting Actor and Best Supporting Actress awards respectively, while Ronald Wong was nominated in the former category as well.

Plot 
The film is about a bank robbery that goes wrong.

Cast
 Ti Lung as Sunny Koo, ex-con gangster 
 Tony Leung Chiu-wai as Sai
 Tony Leung Ka-fai as Captain Chan, hostage negotiator 
 Elaine Jin as Lotus 
 Siu-Fong Lai
 Paul Chun as Captain Cheung
 Bowie Lam as K.W. Poon
 Ronald Wong as William Wong (Boney)
 Sabrina Ho as Bank customer
 Benz Kong as Bank customer
 Jessie Lee as Bank customer

Awards and nominations

References

External links

1987 films
1987 thriller films
Hong Kong thriller films
Films about hostage takings
Films directed by Derek Yee
Films set in Hong Kong
Films shot in Hong Kong
1980s Hong Kong films